Maroubra High School was a public high school located in Maroubra, Sydney, New South Wales, Australia. Established in 1962 as a girls high school, it became co-educational in 1981 before being closed in 2002. It primarily served the areas of South-eastern Sydney and the Eastern Suburbs. The school site has been the campus of the Lycée Condorcet since 2003.

History
Maroubra Junction Girls Junior High School opened in January 1962. The school was the sister school to the nearby South Sydney Boys High School (est. 1953), and became Maroubra Junction Girls High School in October 1969. From January 1981, the school, alongside South Sydney Boys, became co-educational and was known as Maroubra Junction High School. The school was renamed "Maroubra High School" from January 1990. In 2002, the school was declared surplus to the requirements of the Department of Education and Training and closed by December 2002.

In 2003 the vacant school buildings and land were purchased by the Lycée Condorcet with assistance from the local member for Maroubra, NSW Premier Bob Carr, and the Agency for French Education Abroad. It has been the school's campus since then.

Notable alumni and staff
Gita Rivera – Actress and singer.

Staff
Dr Margaret Varady  – Principal of Sydney Girls High School, 1992–2008.

References

External links 
 School website (Archived)
 Lycée Condorcet website

Maroubra, New South Wales
Defunct schools in New South Wales
Educational institutions established in 1962
Educational institutions disestablished in 2002
1962 establishments in Australia
2002 disestablishments in Australia